Ptilolite may refer to the following zeolite minerals:

 Clinoptilolite
 Mordenite